Gradinje is a village in the Istria County, Croatia. Administratively it belongs to the municipality of Cerovlje. Until recently, the village was inhabited by Istro-Romanians who could speak the Istro-Romanian language.

Population

References

External links 
Official homepage of Cerovlje

Populated places in Istria County